Siddayya Gari Matham is a pilgrimage site and a mandal in YSR Kadapa district in the state of Andhra Pradesh in India.

References

Villages in Kadapa district
Tourist attractions in Kadapa district